is a retired Japanese professional catcher.

External links

Living people
1990 births
Baseball people from Hyōgo Prefecture
Japanese baseball players
Nippon Professional Baseball catchers
Saitama Seibu Lions players
Japanese baseball coaches
Nippon Professional Baseball coaches